The Société des Cinéromans was a French film production company of the silent movie era.

History 
In 1919, Gaston Leroux founded the Société des Cinéromans in Nice with René Navarre and Arthur Bernède to publish novels and turn them into films. 

The company was taken over by Pathé in 1922. It continued producing films until 1930.

Filmography 

1919: La Nouvelle Aurore in 16 episodes ;
1920: Tue-la-mort (1920) en 12 episodes, where his daughter Madeleine, aged 13, took the role of Canzonetta ;
1921: Le Sept de trèfle in 12 episodes ;
1922:  in 10 episodes.

Under Pathé:
1922:  by Henri Fescourt
1922: L'homme aux trois masques 
1922: Impéria 
1923: Gossette
1923: L'enfant roi 
1923: Tao  
1923: Vidocq 
1924: La goutte de sang  
1924: Le secret d'Alta Rocca 
1924: L'enfant des halles  
1924: Mandrin by Henri Fescourt
1925: Les misérables, by Henri Fescourt  
1925: Fanfan-la-Tulipe 
1925: Mylord l'Arsouille 
1926: Le Juif errant  
1926: Titi premier, roi des gosses  
1926: L'espionne aux yeux noirs  
1926: Surcouf 
1926: Jean Chouan 
1926: Cinders ... Production Company 
1926: En plongée  
1927: La petite chocolatière 
1927:  ( Mitgiftjäger) Production Company (co-production)
1927: Captain Rascasse 
1927: The Loves of Casanova 
1927: Feu! 
1927: Colette the Unwanted, by René Barberis
1927: The Five Cents of Lavarede
1927: Belphégor
1927: La Glu by Henri Fescourt 
1927: The Duel, by Jacques de Baroncelli
1927: Poker d'as 
1928: L'argent 
1928: Prince Jean
1928: The Vein by René Barberis
1928: L'occident by Henri Fescourt
1928: Princesse Masha 
1928: La storia di una piccola Parigina 
1928: La petite fonctionnaire
1928: Croquette 
1928: Karina the Dancer  
1929: The Unknown Dancer ... Production Company
1929: Le ruisseau  
1929: La tentation 
1929: Paris-Girls  
1929: La femme et le pantin 
1929: La merveilleuse journée
1929: Les fils du soleil

Bibliography 
 Francis Lacassin La Société des Cinéromans (1918–1930)

External links 
 on IMDB
 L'aventure des cinéromans sur Fondation Jérôme Seydoux
 Société des cinéromans on UniFrance

Mass media companies established in 1919
Film production companies of France
Mass media companies disestablished in 1930
1919 establishments in France
1930 disestablishments in France